Etowah marble, also called Georgia pink marble, is a marble with a characteristic pink, salmon, or rose color that comes from quarries near Tate, Georgia.

Notable buildings built with Etowah (also Ethowa) marble
Federal Reserve Bank of Cleveland, 1923, architects Walker and Weeks, Cleveland, Ohio
College Hall (former home of Charles Edward Ringling and wife Edith), 1925, New College of Florida, Sarasota, Florida
Allen Memorial Medical Library, 1926, architects Walker and Weeks, Case Western Reserve University, Cleveland, Ohio
Cook Hall (former home of Charles Edward Ringling's daughter, Hester Ringling Sanford), New College of Florida, Sarasota, Florida
Carillon, Bok Tower Gardens, 1927, Lake Wales, Florida
Joslyn Art Museum, John and Alan McDonald, architects, 1928, Omaha, Nebraska
Tate House, 1928, architects Walker and Weeks, Tate, Georgia 
Pink Palace Museum, 1930, Memphis, Tennessee

References

See also
Georgia Marble Company
Creole marble
List of types of marble

Marble
Pickens County, Georgia